The 1978–79 Cypriot Cup was the 37th edition of the Cypriot Cup. A total of 40 clubs entered the competition. It began on 10 January 1979 with the preliminary round and concluded on 24 June 1979 with the final which was held at Makario Stadium. APOEL won their 11th Cypriot Cup trophy after beating AEL Limassol 1–0 in the final.

Format 
In the 1978–79 Cypriot Cup, participated all the teams of the Cypriot First Division, the Cypriot Second Division and the Cypriot Third Division.

The competition consisted of six knock-out rounds. In all rounds each tie was played as a single leg and was held at the home ground of the one of the two teams, according to the draw results. Each tie winner was qualifying to the next round. If a match was drawn, extra time was following. If extra time was drawn, there was a replay at the ground of the team who were away for the first game. If the rematch was also drawn, then extra time was following and if the match remained drawn after extra time the winner was decided by penalty shoot-out.

The cup winner secured a place in the 1979–80 European Cup Winners' Cup.

Preliminary round 
In the first preliminary draw, participated all the 10 teams of the Cypriot Third Division and 6 of the 14 teams of the Cypriot Second Division (last six of the league table of each group at the day of the draw).

First round 
16 clubs from the Cypriot First Division and the rest clubs from the Cypriot Second Division met the winners of the preliminary round ties:

Second round

Quarter-finals

Semi-finals

Final

Sources

Bibliography

See also 
 Cypriot Cup
 1978–79 Cypriot First Division

Cypriot Cup seasons
1978–79 domestic association football cups
1978–79 in Cypriot football